ECASA can be:

 the acronym of Empresa Cubana de Aeropuertos y Servicios Aeronáuticos, the airport management company of Cuba
 an abbreviation for enteric-coated acetylsalicylic acid